Robert Cameron Sharp (born 3 June 1958) is a Scottish former sprinter. In 1978 he won a gold medal at the Commonwealth Games in Edmonton in the 4 × 100 m relay alongside David Jenkins, Allan Wells, and Drew McMaster. He went on to compete in the 1982 Brisbane Commonwealth Games picking up three bronze medals, in the 100 metres, 200 metres, and 4x100 metres relay.

In 1975 he won the Scottish schoolboys 100 and 200 championships. He went on to compete at the 1980 Summer Olympic Games in Moscow in the 100m, 200m where he reached the semi finals of both sprints, and was a member of the 4 × 100 m relay where the U.K. finished 4th in the final in a new British record.

He took the silver medal in the 200 m at the European Athletics Championships in Athens in 1982, narrowly losing the gold to East German sprinter Olaf Prenzler, but beating another top East German (Frank Emmelmann, the 100 metre winner) into bronze. Sharp also finished fourth in the 100 metres final, again narrowly missing out on a medal.

He also competed at the 1983 World Championships in Athletics and again reached the semi finals of both the sprints, narrowly missing out in places of the finals.

He was also Scottish 100 m and 200 m champion with a famous 100 m victory over 1980 Olympic champion Allan Wells. Sharp also won three UK National Championships, the AAA Championships 100 metres and was also the AAA's indoor 60 metres champion.

He competed in his third Commonwealth Games in Edinburgh in 1986, where he won another bronze medal with the sprint relay team.

Personal bests
100 metres – 10.20 seconds
200 metres – 20.47 seconds

Personal life
In 1991 he was involved in a serious car accident which left him physically and mentally disabled. Married to Carol Lightfoot, former Scottish 800 metre runner, and has two daughters, one of whom, Lynsey, competes as an 800-metre runner. Both daughters are national athletics champions.

References

Living people
1958 births
British male sprinters
Scottish male sprinters
Olympic athletes of Great Britain
Athletes (track and field) at the 1980 Summer Olympics
Commonwealth Games gold medallists for Scotland
Commonwealth Games bronze medallists for Scotland
Commonwealth Games medallists in athletics
Athletes (track and field) at the 1978 Commonwealth Games
Athletes (track and field) at the 1982 Commonwealth Games
Athletes (track and field) at the 1986 Commonwealth Games
World Athletics Championships athletes for Great Britain
European Athletics Championships medalists
Medallists at the 1978 Commonwealth Games
Medallists at the 1982 Commonwealth Games
Medallists at the 1986 Commonwealth Games